Wagneria is a genus of flies in the family Tachinidae. More junior homonyms exist of Wagneria than any other animal genus name.

Species

Wagneria albifrons Kugler, 1977
Wagneria alpina Villeneuve, 1910
Wagneria compressa (Mesnil, 1974)
Wagneria cornuta Curran, 1928
Wagneria costata (Fallén, 1815)
Wagneria cunctans (Meigen, 1824)
Wagneria depressa Herting, 1973
Wagneria dilatata Kugler, 1977
Wagneria discreta Herting, 1971
Wagneria gagatea Robineau-Desvoidy, 1830
Wagneria heterocera (Robineau-Desvoidy, 1863)
Wagneria lacrimans (Rondani, 1861)
Wagneria major Curran, 1928
Wagneria micronychia Mesnil, 1974
Wagneria micropyga Herting, 1987
Wagneria ocellaris Reinhard, 1955
Wagneria pacata Reinhard, 1955
Wagneria theodori Mesnil, 1974
Wagneria vernata West, 1925

References

Dexiinae
Diptera of Europe
Diptera of Asia
Diptera of North America
Diptera of Africa
Tachinidae genera
Taxa named by Jean-Baptiste Robineau-Desvoidy